HMAS Warramunga (I44/D123) was a  destroyer of the Royal Australian Navy (RAN). Built during World War II, the destroyer entered service in late 1942. She was initially assigned to convoy escort duties, but was assigned to the joint Australian-American Task Force 74 in 1943, and was involved in supporting numerous amphibious landings through the South-east Asian region until the end of the war. From 1950 and 1952, Warramunga fought in the Korean War, then was converted into an anti-submarine destroyer. Returning to service in 1954, the destroyer was one of the first RAN ships to operate with the Far East Strategic Reserve, and undertook two tours with the organisation before she was decommissioned in 1959 and sold for ship breaking in 1963.

Description

Warramunga was one of three  destroyers built for the RAN during World War II. Propulsion machinery consisted of three drum boilers feeding Parsons impulse-reaction turbines, which supplied  to the two propeller shafts. The ship's company consisted of 7 officers and 190 sailors.

When she was launched in 1942, the ship's main armament consisted of six 4.7-inch Mark XII guns sited in three twin turrets. This was supplemented by two 4-inch Mark XVI* guns in a single twin turret, a quad-barrelled 2-pounder Mark VIII pom pom, six single 20 mm Oerlikons, a quadruple 21 inch (533 mm) torpedo tube set, and a rail to launch depth charges. During 1945, the six Oerlikons were replaced with six 40 mm Bofors guns, and two depth charge throwers were added. In 1949, half of the torpedo payload and most of the depth charge payload was removed, to allow for the installation of a new motor cutter. In 1952, the aftmost 4.7-inch turret was replaced by a Squid anti-submarine mortar.

Construction and career
Warramunga was laid down by Cockatoo Docks and Engineering Company at its Cockatoo Island Dockyard on 10 February 1940. The destroyer was launched on 7 February 1942 by the wife of Francis Michael Forde, the Minister for the Army. Warramunga was commissioned into the RAN on 23 December 1942, the day after her completion. The ship's name comes from the Warramungu Aborigines.

World War II
Warramunga was originally assigned to convoy escort duty between Queensland and New Guinea.  During April and May 1943, the destroyer was docked for refit. On completion, she was assigned to Task Force 74, which was operating off the coast of Queensland. In July, the Task Force provided cover for Operation Chronicle, the landings at Kiriwina and Woodlark Islands. After  was damaged by a Japanese torpedo on 20 July, Warramunga and sister ship  escorted the cruiser from Espiritu Santo to Sydney. After this, Warramunga escorted two convoys from Townsville to Milne Bay, then a force of US Marines from Melbourne to Goodenough Island. After a refit in Sydney, Warramunga escorted the cruiser  to Brisbane, where the two ships joined Task Force 74. On 29 October, Warramunga shelled Gasmata. On 15 December, the destroyer supported the amphibious landings at Arawe. On 26 December, Warramunga was involved in pre-landing bombardments at Cape Gloucester.

At the start of 1944, Warramunga helped cover the Landing at Saidor, before leaving Task Force 74 for refits in Sydney. After rejoining the task fore at the start of February, Warramunga participated in amphibious landings in the Admiralties, at Tanamera Bay, Wakde-Sarmi, and Biak. From May to July, the destroyer was assigned to patrol and escort duties. On 22 July, Warramunga and the cruiser  sailed to Sydney for refits and leave. Returning in August, the destroyer was involved in the Morotai landings on 15 September.

At the start of 1945, while assigned to Manus Island, Warramungas Oerlikon guns were replaced with Bofors taken from a disabled US Landing Ship Dock. During the invasion of Lingayen Gulf in January, Warramunga was nearly hit by a Japanese kamikaze aircraft, which instead crashed into the destroyer . On 1 May, the destroyer supported the landing at Tarakan, then nine days later participated in landings at Wewak, before sailing to Australia for a two-month refit. On her return to Subic Bay, Warramunga was present for the Japanese surrender of the Philippines. The destroyer then sailed for Japan, and was present in Tokyo Bay on Victory over Japan Day (2 September 1945), when the Japanese Instrument of Surrender was signed. The destroyer earned five battle honours for her wartime service: "Pacific 1943–45", "New Guinea 1943–44", "Leyte Gulf 1944", "Lingayen Gulf 1945", and "Borneo 1945". After the end of World War II, Warramunga assisted in the repatriation of prisoners-of-war, and served four tours of duty with the British Commonwealth Occupation Force.

Korean War

On 6 August 1950, Warramunga sailed to join United Nations forces involved in the Korean War. Most of the ship's first tour consisted of patrols and shore bombardments. In February 1951, Warramunga and the U.S. Navy destroyer  were sent to recover an intelligence party. En route, it was learned that the party had been captured by the North Koreans, who had set up the extraction to capture the recovery party, and when the two destroyers received the light signal, shelled the area and killed the North Koreans. During May and June, the destroyer underwent repairs for gale damage. On 6 September, she returned to Sydney and docked for refit.

On 11 January 1952, Warramunga sailed for a second Korean War tour. During this second tour, which concluded on 12 August, the ship operated on coastal patrols, and fired 4,151 4.7-inch shells. A sixth battle honour, "Korea 1950–52" was awarded to the destroyer to recognise these deployments. On 12 November, the destroyer docked for conversion into an anti-submarine destroyer, including the replacement of her aft gun turret with a Squid mortar.

Post-war
Warramunga returned to duty in February 1955, and remained in Australian waters until May 1955, when she sailed to the Far East for exercises with the Royal Navy and Royal New Zealand Navy. Warramunga stayed in the area, and became one of the first Australian warships assigned to the Far East Strategic Reserve. She returned on 19 December. In April 1957, the destroyer was involved in South East Asia Treaty Organisation exercises. In 1958, she operated again with the Strategic Reserve.

Decommissioning and fate
Warramunga paid off to reserve at Sydney on 7 December 1959. The ship was marked for disposal on 22 May 1961. She was sold to Kinoshita and Company Limited on 15 February 1963, and was towed to Japan for ship breaking.

Notes

References

Further reading

 
 

Tribal-class destroyers (1936) of the Royal Australian Navy
Ships built in New South Wales
1942 ships
World War II destroyers of Australia
Korean War destroyers of Australia